The Crozier Channel is a natural waterway through the central Canadian Arctic Archipelago in the Northwest Territories of Canada. It separates Prince Patrick Island (to the north-west) and Eglinton Island (to the south-east).  It opens into the McClure Strait at its southern end. It is named for the explorer, Francis Crozier; one of several such memorials in the Canadian Arctic.

Bodies of water of the Northwest Territories
Channels of Canada
Channels of the Arctic Ocean